The Noise Pollution and Abatement Act of 1972 is a statute of the United States initiating a federal program of regulating noise pollution with the intent of protecting human health and minimizing annoyance of noise to the general public.

The Act established mechanisms of setting emission standards for virtually every source of noise, including motor vehicles, aircraft, certain types of HVAC (heating, ventilation, and air-conditioning) equipment and major appliances. It also put local governments on notice as to their responsibilities in land-use planning to address noise mitigation. This noise regulation framework comprised a broad data base detailing the extent of noise health effects. 

Congress ended funding of the federal noise control program in 1981, which curtailed development of further national regulations. Since then, starting in 1982, the primary responsibility to addressing noise pollution shifted to state and local governments. The Environmental Protection Agency (EPA) retains authority to conduct research and publish information on noise and its effects on the public, which is often included nowadays in environmental impact assessments for new urban developments. The initial EPA regulations and programs provided a basis for development of many state and local government noise control laws across the United States. See Noise regulation.

See also
 Aircraft noise, for a treatment of aviation related noise.
 Industrial noise, for a discussion of workplace noise.
 Railway noise regulations, for a discussion of the prevalent form of environmental noise.
Environmental noise, for a discussion on how noise affects in the environment.

References

Noise pollution
1972 in the environment
1972 in law
United States federal environmental legislation
Sound in the United States
United States federal legislation articles without infoboxes